Krishna is a Hindu deity, an incarnation of Lord Vishnu. Numerous films were made on his life and teachings. The list is following:

Krishna Arjuna Yuddha (1923)
Krishnavtar (1933)
Krishna Bhakta Bodana (1944)
Krishna Kanhaiya (1952)
Krishna Bhakta Sudama (1968)
Krishna Bhakta Sudama (1980)
Sri Krishna 2006, Telugu film
Krishna (2006 film)
Krishna (2012 film)
Oh My God!, 2012 satirical film about Hindu deities
Krishna Aur Kans (2012)

References

 
Krishna